Shevon Daniel (born 15 March 2004) is a Sri Lankan cricketer. His elder brother Jehan Daniel is also a cricketer.

Biography 
He pursued his primary and secondary education at Saint Joseph's College, Colombo. He also played school cricket for St. Joseph's College and also captained his school cricket team. He also played age group rugby for his school team before specialising in the sport of cricket.

In July 2022, he captained St. Joseph's College in their 88th annual big match clash (which is popularly known as the Battle of the Saints) against rival school St. Peter's College and the match eventually ended in a draw.

Career 
He was a key member of the Sri Lanka national under-19 cricket team which emerged as runners-up to India during the 2021 ACC Under-19 Asia Cup.

He made his first-class cricket debut for Colombo against Jaffna on 24 February 2022 during the 2022 National Super League 4-Day Tournament at the Mahinda Rajapaksa International Cricket Stadium.

He made his T20 debut for Sinhalese Sports Club against Badureliya Sports Club on 22 May 2022 during the 2022 Major Clubs T20 Tournament at the Colombo Cricket Club Ground. On his professional T20 debut appearance, he smashed an unbeaten 59 off just 38 deliveries batting at number three and his knock came at a brisk strike rate of 155.26 which was also inclusive of 5 sixes. His knock propelled Sinhalese Sports Club to a decent total of 146/6 on the board which the team went onto defend successfully.

He made his List A debut for Sinhalese Sports Club against Saracens Sports Club on 27 June 2022 during the 2022-23 Major Clubs Limited Over Tournament.

In January 2022, he was named in Sri Lanka's squad for the 2022 ICC Under-19 Cricket World Cup in the West Indies.

He was shortlisted as one of the frontrunners to claim the prestigious Observer-Mobitel Schoolboy Cricketer of the Year award. He was signed by Dambulla Giants for the 2022 Lanka Premier League.

He played for Gujranwala Giants in the inaugural edition of the Pakistan Junior League in 2022 and had a breakout tournament with the bat scoring 176 runs in 5 matches.

In November 2022, he was invited by Rajasthan Royals in its training camp ahead of the 2023 Indian Premier League.

References 

2004 births
Living people
Sri Lankan cricketers
Alumni of Saint Joseph's College, Colombo
Cricketers from Colombo